Gráinne is a novel by Keith Roberts published in 1987.

Plot summary
Gráinne is a novel in which Alastair Bevan sees his one-time lover Gráinne achieve fame, found a cult, and then die to achieve mythic immortality.

Reception
Dave Langford reviewed Gráinne for White Dwarf #90, and stated that "The final, haunting images effectively combined fairy mounds and World War III, but didn't overcome my frustration: Gráinne's barely-glimpsed story fails to conquer the dead weight of Bevan's autobiographical longueurs."

Reviews
Review by Helen McNabb (1987) in Vector 139
Review by Lee Montgomerie (1987) in Interzone, #21 Autumn 1987
Review by Don D'Ammassa (1988) in Science Fiction Chronicle, #101 February 1988

References

1987 novels